Afronemopoda is a genus of flies in the family Sepsidae.

Species
Afronemopoda ealaensis (Vanschuytbroeck, 1962)

References

Sepsidae
Diptera of Africa
Brachycera genera